Cobham Hall is an English country house in the county of Kent, England. The grade I listed building is one of the largest and most important houses in Kent, re-built as an Elizabethan prodigy house by William Brooke, 10th Baron Cobham (1527–1597). The central block was rebuilt 1672–82 by Charles Stewart, 3rd Duke of Richmond, 6th Duke of Lennox (1639–1672).

Today the building houses Cobham Hall School, a private boarding school for girls, established there in 1962, which retains  of the ancient estate.

The historic dairy, designed by the architect James Wyatt as an eyecatcher, was restored by the Landmark Trust  and opened as a holiday destination in 2019.

Building history

There has been a manor house on the site since the 12th century. The current building consists of a pair of Tudor wings built for William Brooke, 10th Baron Cobham in the 16th century and a later classical central block, the "Cross Wing", remodelled in 1661–63 by Peter Mills of London for Charles Stewart, 3rd Duke of Richmond. 

In the 18th century, the hall passed to the Bligh family, later Earls of Darnley. The attic storey was extended and other alterations made for John Bligh, 3rd Earl of Darnley by Sir William Chambers, ca 1767–70 A kitchen court was added to the rear in 1771–73. The most notable feature of the interior is the two-storey Gilt Hall, designed and installed by George Shakespear, master carpenter and architect, of London, who made extensive interior alterations, 1770–81. The organ was built by John Snetzler in 1778–9.

John Bligh, 4th Earl of Darnley, who inherited in 1781, employed James Wyatt extensively, for interiors that included the picture gallery and the dining room, and for stables and a Gothic dairy. The library was fitted up by George Stanley Repton in 1817–20, and with his brother, John Adey Repton, in Jacobethan style, including the ceiling for "Queen Elizabeth's Room" (1817). Their father, Humphry Repton, was hired to design a landscape plan for the estate and completed one of his famous "Red Books" for Cobham in 1790. Cobham Hall remained the family home of the Earls of Darnley until 1957; it is now home to the school. It is open to the public on a limited number of days each year.

The building has been used as a film set. A scene in Agent Cody Banks 2 in which Frankie Muniz fights Keith Allen in a room full of priceless treasures was filmed in the Gilt Hall. Scenes from an adaption of Bleak House were also filmed outside the building, and it was also used in a few scenes in the comedy sketch show Tittybangbang. The hall is used as the Abbey Mount school in the 2008 film Wild Child starring Emma Roberts, and as the Foundling Hospital in the CBBC adaptation of Hetty Feather.

Family owners 

Families who have owned the manor include the Cobham family (Barons of Cobham), the Stewart family (Earls of Lennox), and the Bligh family (Earls of Darnley).

References

Further reading
Six Wills Relating to Cobham Hall, Archaeologia Cantiana, Vol. 11, 1877, pp. 199–304  (1. William Brooke, 10th Baron Cobham; 2. Frances Countess of Kildare; 3. Frances Duchess of Richmond and Lenox; 4. Charles Stuart Duke of Richmond and Lenox; 5. Sir Joseph Williamson; 6. Lady Catherine O'Brien).
Waller, J.G., The Lords of Cobham, their Monuments and the Church, Archaeologia Cantiana, Vol. 11, 1877, pp. 49–112   & Vol. 12, pp. 113–166;
Stephens, P.G., On the Pictures at Cobham Hall, Archaeologia Cantiana, Vol. 11, 1877, pp. 160–188.
Cobham and its Manors 
Glover, Robert (Somerset Herald), Memorials of the Family of Cobham, Collectanea Topographica et Genealogica, Vol.7, 1841, Chap. XXVII, pp. 320–354 
John Gough Nichols, Sepulchral Memorials of the Cobham Family, 1841: project never completed/published 
F. C. Brooke, Sepulchral Memorials of the Cobham Family (1836–74), completion of Nichols' work.
Esme Wingfield-Stratford, The Lords of Cobham Hall, London, 1959.

External links

Grade I listed buildings in Kent
Gravesham
Country houses in Kent
Grade I listed houses in Kent
Manors in Kent
Bligh family
Gardens by Humphry Repton